The Tony Award for Best Special Theatrical Event was awarded from 2001 to 2009 to live theatrical productions that were not plays or musicals. The category was created after the 2000 controversy of Contact winning Best Musical; the show used pre-recorded music and featured no singing. The category was retired in 2009 allowing the shows that were previously eligible for it to be eligible in Best Play or Best Musical categories, if they met the proper criteria. The shows are also now eligible in other creative categories.

In 1999 and 2000 a Special Tony Award for a Live Theatrical Presentation was awarded which may be seen as the precursor of the Best Special Theatrical Event award and is generally included in this award's listing.

Winners and nominees

1990s

2000s

See also
 Laurence Olivier Award for Best Entertainment
 Drama Desk Award for Unique Theatrical Experience

References

External links
 Tony Awards Official site
 Tony Awards at Internet Broadway database Listing
 Tony Awards at broadwayworld.com

Tony Awards
Awards established in 2001
Awards disestablished in 2009
2001 establishments in New York City
2009 disestablishments in the United States